Great Plain is an unincorporated area in the City of Danbury, Fairfield County, Connecticut. A former farming community, only remnants exist of this once thriving agricultural hub. It is located in the northeast section of the city, sharing a border with the Beaverbrook area of Danbury and Brookfield, CT.

History

Named for its broad expanse, Great Plain gained a reputation for fruitful fields and prosperous farmers.

The original Mallory Hat Company, which would become one of Danbury's most prominent hat manufacturers, was established in Great Plain in 1823. At this time, Danbury was in the early stages of becoming the "Hat City of the World"  The small shop operated at Great Plain until the 1850s, when Mallory decided to relocate downtown.

Chapel 
Great Plain Union Chapel was constructed in 1890. The highly ornamented Victorian Vernacular style building cost $1,100 to build. For a time, it was the centerpiece of the neighborhood but eventually began deteriorating. It has been noted as in need of repair dating back to 1961, when there was an effort to restore the building. Despite past efforts, it remains dilapidated today.

Schoolhouse 

Built in 1856, the Greek Revival one-room schoolhouse served the students of the Great Plain community until the 1940s. In 1954 the City of Danbury transferred the building to the Great Plain District Association, a neighborhood organization with plans to convert it into a community center. In February 1955, 75 residents from the neighborhood joined in a housewarming for its opening. The Old Great Plain School is one of only three one-room schoolhouses still standing in Danbury.

Candlewood Lake

Communities 
Aqua Vista
Boulder Ridge
Candlewood Vista
Cedar Heights
Driftwood Point
Hawthorne Terrace
Lattins Landing
Pleasant Acres
Snug Harbor
Ta'agan Point

References 

Neighborhoods in Connecticut
Populated places in Fairfield County, Connecticut
Geography of Danbury, Connecticut
Danbury, Connecticut